Birgitte Alsted   (born 15 June 1942) is a Danish violinist, teacher and composer.

Alsted was born in Odense, and was educated at the Royal Danish Academy of Music and in Warsaw.

She has done much within the electronic music and often uses creative expressions, which includes other forms. Thus, she has been a part in theater and performance / dance in Denmark. Her work list, besides the music theater includes works for soloists and chamber ensembles, often unconventional compositions and the use of acoustic instruments.

Birgitte Alsted also worked some with multimedia performances in which the use of electronic resources, poetry, dance and slides have been compounded in experimental fashion. Literature and poetry, both old and new have been an important source of inspiration for her.

Birgitte Alsted was a founder of the "Gruppen for Alternativ Musik", which was important for her career as a composer. The group experimented with alternative forms and collective improvisation and performed the members' own compositions in unusual places, such as the Nørreport Station and Copenhagen Zoo.

Alsted has worked as a teacher in Hørsholm municipality in St. Annæ Gymnasium and in Copenhagen. In addition, she has been a violinist in the Danish National Symphony Orchestra.

Works
1988: Vækst
1995: Sorgsang II
1996: Sorgsang V
2001: Zweigeigen
2002: Zu versuchen, die Fragen
2002: Odysseus on a Minicruise
2006: Dance with Bells

Recordings
Nyvang and Alsted: Planetarium Music includes Sorgsang II (Lament II) (1995) by Alsted. Da Capo Marco Polo CD 8.224083 (1997)
Zweigeigen (2001) with Duo Gelland. Nosag records CD 152 (2007)

References

Petersen, Mette Koustrup (2004) : "Birgitte Alsted - en biografi - ", ("Birgitte Alsted -a Biography"), Copenhagen University July 2004
Die Musik in Geschichte und Gegenwart (MGG), Kassel 1994–2008: Birgitte Alsted
This article was initially translated from the Danish Wikipedia.

External links
Dansk Kvindebiografisk leksikon (Danish Women's Biographical Dictionary) page, accessed 10 February 2010 (Danish)
Da Capo Records biographical page, accessed 10 February 2010
Da Capo Records 'Planetarium Music' page, accessed 10 February 2010
LARM biography page, accessed 10 February 2010
Edition S profile, accessed 23 April 2012

1942 births
Living people
People from Odense
Danish classical composers
Danish classical violinists
Women classical composers
20th-century classical composers
21st-century classical composers
20th-century Danish composers
21st-century Danish composers
Danish women composers
21st-century classical violinists
Women classical violinists
20th-century women composers
21st-century women composers